Gibraltar Rock usually refers to the Rock of Gibraltar, a promontory on the south of the Iberian Peninsula. 

Gibraltar Rock can also refer to:

 Gibraltar rock (candy), a type of candy associated with Salem, Massachusetts
 Gibraltar Rock Provincial Park Reserve, a park in Nova Scotia, Canada
 Gibraltar Rock State Natural Area, a protected area in Wisconsin
 Gibraltar Rock (Western Australia), a granite outcrop in south-western Australia